The 2021–22 Providence Friars Men's ice hockey season is the 71st season of play for the program. They represent Providence College in the 2021–22 NCAA Division I men's ice hockey season and for the 38th season in the Hockey East conference. The are coached by Nate Leaman, in his 11th season, and play their home games at Schneider Arena.

Season
Providence began the season well, winning its first three games and headed into the Ice Breaker Tournament ranked in the top 10. Unfortunately, when the Friars faced other highly-ranked opponents, they weren't able to sustain the same level of success. They finished last in the tournament but recovered a week later with a win over Denver. They regained their spot in the top-10 and held it until early November when they were swept by defending national champion Massachusetts. The two losses were very harmful to Providence since their record left them with little opportunity for improvement over the next month. The Friars did win the succeeding six games, however, because all of them were to unranked teams (some of whom had terrible records) they actually fell in the rankings, dropping down to 13th by the beginning of December.

The team finally got a chance to climb back into postseason contention when they met Northeastern. Unfortunately, just as they had against the Minutemen, Providence dropped both games to the Huskies and fell further down the standings. The Friars performed well in their four other games during the month but none were against ranked teams.

COVID-19 ended up causing Providence to cancel a few games at the beginning of January and the team looked out of sorts afterwards. Providence played inconsistently over the second half of the year. While the team did record impressive wins against upper-echelon clubs, the bright spots couldn't cover up the fact that, in a down year for Hockey East, the Friars finished in the bottom half of the standings.

Providence entered postseason play with only a slim chance for an at-large bid. The Friars would likely need to make the conference championship game to have any hope at making the tournament but even that would not be a guarantee. They dominated Vermont in the opening match, outshooting the Catamounts 40–18, but only scraped by with a 2–1 victory. The lack of scoring continued in the quarterfinals when they took on Massachusetts. They continued to send a barrage of shots on goal, firing 47 in total, but again could only manage 2 goals. The Minutemen, however, had no trouble getting the puck past Jaxson Stauber and notched 4 on only 19 shots and ended the Friars' season.

Departures

Recruiting

Roster
As of August 12, 2021.

Standings

Schedule and results

|-
!colspan=12 style=";" | Regular Season

|-
!colspan=12 ! style=""; | 

|-
!colspan=12 style=";" | Regular Season

|-
!colspan=12 ! style=""; | 

|-
!colspan=12 style=";" | Regular Season

|-
!colspan=12 style=";" |

Scoring statistics

Goaltending statistics

Rankings

Note: USCHO did not release a poll in week 24.

Awards and honors

Players drafted into the NHL

2022 NHL Entry Draft

† incoming freshman

References

2021-22
Providence Friars
Providence Friars
Providence Friars
Providence Friars